Geoffrey Franklin Bruce is a former Canadian diplomat. He was appointed concurrently as High Commissioner to Uganda and High Commissioner to Kenya. He was later Ambassador Extraordinary and Plenipotentiary to Portugal.

External links 
 Foreign Affairs and International Trade Canada Complete List of Posts 

Year of birth missing (living people)
Living people
High Commissioners of Canada to Uganda
High Commissioners of Canada to Kenya
Ambassadors of Canada to Portugal